The 2015 Arlington mayoral election was held on May 9, 2015 to elect the mayor of Arlington, Texas. The election was officially nonpartisan.

Jeff Williams unseated incumbent mayor Robert Cluck.

If no candidate had obtained a majority of the vote, a runoff would have been held.

Results

References

Arlington mayoral
Arlington
2015
Non-partisan elections